Rodney A. Welch is professor of medical microbiology and immunology at the University of Wisconsin-Madison. He is a specialist in bacterial pathogenesis and toxins produced by the bacterium Escherichia coli. He is a fellow of the American Academy of Microbiology and since 2004 has held the chair of Robert Turell Infections Diseases. In 2014 he was named as part of a team at Wisconsin-Madison that was awarded a grant of up to $16 million from the National Institutes of Health to search for new antibiotics.

References

Living people
Cornell University alumni
Medical College of Virginia alumni
University of Wisconsin–Madison faculty
American microbiologists
Year of birth missing (living people)